Back Door Slam – EP is an iTunes-exclusive EP by blues-rock power trio Back Door Slam. The EP consists of four tracks total, all of which are covers. The last track, Red House, is a live version.

Track listing 
 "Back Door Slam" (Hayes, Hayes) – 3:51
 "Riding With the King" (Hiatt) - 4:20
 "Been Down So Long" (Morrison, Krieger, Manzarek, and Densmore) - 2:45
 "Red House" (Hendrix) - 10:07

Personnel 
Davy Knowles - guitar, vocals
Adam Jones - bass
Ross Doyle - drums

2008 EPs
Back Door Slam albums